was a Japanese printmaking artist associated with the sōsaku-hanga movement, and son of shin-hanga artist Hiroshi Yoshida.

Childhood
One of Yoshida's legs was paralysed during his early childhood. Not being able to attend school, he enjoyed watching animals and his father's printmaking workshop. Encouraged by his grandmother Rui Yoshida, Tōshi often sketched animals.

Early artistic development
Yoshida's artistic career was a long struggle between fidelity to his father's legacy and freedom from it. Hiroshi Yoshida, a shin-hanga landscape artist, dictated Tōshi's early artistic development. In 1926, Tōshi chose animals as his primary subjects to distinguish himself from his father, who was a landscape printmaker. However, in the 1930s, Tōshi started making landscape paintings and prints similar to his father's works. Father and son traveled together and even painted side by side. From 1930 to 1931, Hiroshi and Tōshi traveled to India, Shanghai, Hong Kong, Malaysia, Singapore, Calcutta, and Burma.

In 1940 he married Kiso Yoshida (née Katsura) and they soon had five sons.

Wartime
Yoshida's adult career began under adverse circumstances. Yoshida was still an apprentice in the Yoshida family system. He had little, if any, artistic autonomy from his father. 1936 was the beginning of military dictatorship, under which art was under censorship. In 1943, Yoshida produced oil paintings that depict factory workers and civilians engaging in war production. After the war, because of economic hardship, Yoshida published seventeen landscape works in 1951 for American personnel and their wives.

Postwar turn to abstract expressionism
The death of his father in 1950 marked Tōshi's total break from his past and from naturalism. In 1952, Yoshida began a series of abstract woodcuts, influenced by his brother, Hodaka Yoshida. In 1953, Tōshi traveled to the United States, Mexico, London, and the Near East. He made presentations in thirty museums and galleries in eighteen states. From 1954 to 1973, Yoshida made three hundred nonobjective prints.

Animal prints and Africa
In 1971, Yoshida returned to his innate affinity for animals and focused on birds and animals again. His Humming Bird and Fuchsia in 1971 was a prelude to the African works that he began the following year. From 1971 to 1994, until the last years of his life, Tōshi worked almost exclusively on animal prints. Tōshi was also a children's book illustrator. He wrote his own short stories and made illustrations in the Animal Picture Book series.

See also
Yoshida family artists

References
Allen, Laura W. A Japanese Legacy: Four Generations of Yoshida Family Artists. Minneapolis: Minneapolis Institute of Arts, Chicago: Art Media Resources (2002).
Japanese Print Making: a handbook of Traditional & Modern Techniques. Preface by Oliver Statler.
Skibbe, Eugene M. Yoshida Toshi: Nature, Art and Peace. Minnesota: Seascape Publications (1996).
Yoshida, Toshi & Rei Yuki. Japanese Printmaking, A Handbook of Traditional & Modern Techniques. Rutland, Vermont & Tokyo, Japan: Charles E. Tuttle Co. Inc.  (1966).

External links
Toshi Yoshida
Toshi Yoshida: 12 works
Toshi Yoshida Woodblock Prints Gallery
Yoshida Toshi Gallery

Japanese printmakers
1911 births
1995 deaths
Sosaku hanga artists